Sekuru Kaguvi (Kagubi, Kakubi), was a svikiro (medium), a traditionalist leader in pre-colonial Zimbabwe, and a leader in the Shona rebellion of 1896-1897 against European rule, known as the First Chimurenga. The sobriquet "Kaguvi" was a designation given at times those who were said to speak for the traditional Shona supreme deity Mwari. 

The name "Kaguvi" is normally associated with the man called Gumboreshumba (c.1870-1898), who claimed to speak for the original Kaguvi's spirit. Some Ndebele historians say that the form "Kaguvi" is the anglicised rendering of his name by Europeans, and that his real name was "Kakubi Ncube", although Kaguvi was not an ethnic Ndebele. In 1896 he coordinated together with Nehanda, to help in organising the opposition to colonial administration. He ensured that the Shona would rebel to support the uprising of the Ndebele people in the First Chimurenga, although that conflict was already almost over by the time that the Shona joined in.

Gumboreshumba was one of several people who claimed to be mediums of famous traditional spiritual personae during the First Chimurenga. Gumboreshumba (meaning: "lion's paw"), lived in Chikwaka's village by Goromonzi Hill, Zimbabwe. He had four wives, one of whom was Chief Mashonganyika's daughter. The other three wives were received from a headman named Gondo. It is alleged that Gumboreshumba Kaguvi was known as a source of good luck in hunting and that he was able to speak to trees and rocks. He was believed to be the spirit husband of the other great Shona svikiro, Nehanda. When the rebellion collapsed, he was charged with the murder of an African policeman called 'Charlie', whom he had accused of collaborating with the colonial authorities. Kaguvi was found guilty and hanged in 1898.

Notes

Sources
Rasmussen, R.K., and Rubert, S.C., 1990. Historical Dictionary of Zimbabwe, Scarecrow Press.

External links
Life and Times of Sekuru Kaguvi

History of Zimbabwe